Alfredo Rossi (15 August 1906 – 5 September 1986) was an Italian pianist who specialized in chamber music and was notably famous at his time as accompanist to solo artists.

Biography 
From an early age, he studied piano with his mother, Gisella Vezzani. At the age of 6 years he was presented to a contest at the Giuseppe Verdi Conservatory in Milan and obtained a scholarship to continue his studies. In the Conservatory studied piano with the teacher , finishing the studies in July 1925. Later he studied composition in the same Conservatory, under the direction of the teacher Arrigo Pedrollo, finishing in 1931. He won the first prize of the conservatory and the famous titles "Durini" and "Erba". He also won the first prize of the Interprovincial Lombard Union of the Musician Contest. He completed further studies with Nicola Janigro, father of the famous cellist Antonio Janigro. Precisely, accompanying Antonio Janigro began to give his first concerts, and curiously, in his first presentations also accompanied his brothers Umberto Rossi (cellist) and Eliane Rossi (soprano).

He had great success in Spain, which opened the doors to start gigging in this country, both soloist and as an accompanist.

In Madrid, he met his future wife, Andrea Miguel Llorente, with whom he had two children, Lucia and Roberto.

After offering some successful concerts in Brazil accompanying Pierre Fournier, he warned that he would have better job opportunities in South America. He decided to settle in Buenos Aires, Argentina, a city to which his mother and three of his sisters had emigrated earlier. In the Port of Barcelona on March 30, 1951, he sailed with his family aboard the transatlantic Conte Bianacamano, disembarking on April 14, 1951, in Buenos Aires, where he definitely established.

Chamber music 
Artistically he specialized in chamber music, and tried from the teaching to promote the development of this specialty. In his own words, he was not an accompanist of soloists but was part of the chamber duos.

Teaching 
He was professor of piano in the following conservatories:
 Conservatory "Giuseppe Verdi", Milan, Italy
 Istituto Superiore di Studi Musicali "Gaetano Donizetti", Bergamo, Italy
 Conservatory "Beethoven", Buenos Aires, Argentina
 Conservatorio Superior de Música "Manuel de Falla", Buenos Aires, Argentina.<ref>"Manuel de Falla, el instituto que lucha por una sede propia", La Nación, 3 June 2017, Argentina.</ref>
 Conservatory "Juan José Castro", La Lucila, Buenos Aires, Argentina

 Travel 

In addition to concerts in his native country, he gave concerts in many countries, among others:

 Argentina: Buenos Aires, La Plata, Adrogué, Córdoba, Tucumán, Santa Fé, Mar del Plata, Bahía Blanca, Paraná, Mendoza, Punta Alta, San Rafael, Concordia, Campana, Mercedes.
 Belgium: Liège.
 Brazil: São Paulo, Río de Janeiro, Recife, Niterói, Salvador de Bahía, Pernambuco, Curitiba, Porto Alegre, Belem, Sergipe, Ponta Grossa, João Pessoa, São Luís.
 Chile: Santiago de Chile, Valparaíso, Viña del Mar.
 China: Macau.
 Colombia: Bogotá.
 Croatia: Zagreb.
 Cuba: Havana, Santiago de Cuba.
 Curaçao: Willemstad.
 Ecuador: Quito.
 France: Paris.
 Germany: Berlin, Essen, Barmen, Wiesbaden
 Gibraltar
 Guatemala: Guatemala City.
 Hong Kong
 Japan: Osaka, Kōchi, Matsuyama, Miyazaki, Tokyo.
 India: Mumbai.
 Iran: Tehran.
 Italy: Milan, Siena, Brescia, Bolzano, Turin, Trieste, Bari, Rome, Lodi, Venice, Catania.
 Malaysia: Penang.
 Mexico: Mexico City, Monterrey.
 Netherlands: The Hague, Amsterdam.
 Paraguay: Asunción.
 Peru: Lima.
 Portugal: Lisboa, Oporto.
 Singapore"Great reception for Michelin", Singapore Free Press, 24 March 1960, Singapore."Cellist on the air", Singapore Free Press, 1 May 1960, Singapore.
 Spain: Madrid, Barcelona, Valencia, Zaragoza, Cádiz, Girona, Terrassa, Sabadell, Bilbao, Pamplona, Vitoria-Gasteiz, Santander, San Sebastián, A Coruña, Oviedo, Gijón, Pontevedra, Badajoz, Málaga, Valladolid, Tarragona, Vigo, Lugo, Ourense, Alicante, Granada.
 Thailand: Bangkok.
 Uruguay: Montevideo.
 Venezuela: Maracay.
 Vietnam: Saigon.

 Concerts 

 Related artists 
He accompanied famous artists of his time, such as: Antonio Janigro, Pierre Fournier, Guila Bustabo, Victoria de los Ángeles, Montserrat Caballé, Elisabeth Schwarzkopf, Georg Kulenkampff, Virginia Paris, Dimitry Markevitch, Mascia Predit, Gaspar Cassadó, Bernard Michelin, Eva Heinitz, Váša Příhoda, Alfredo Campoli, Ida Haendel, Enrico Mainardi, Riccardo Brengola, André Navarra, Camilla Wicks, Ivry Gitlis, Ruggiero Ricci, Ricardo Odnoposoff, Gloria Davy, Isaac José Weinstein, Erno Valasek, Ruben Varga, Peter-Lukas Graf, Simón Bajour, Anahí Carfi, Christian Ferras, Carmela Saghy, Lawrence Winters, Agustín León Ara, Uto Ughi, McHenry Boatwright, among others.

 Recordings 
 Montserrat Caballé at the Teatro Colón. Franz Schubert, Richard Strauss, Claude Debussy, Enrique Granados and Joaquín Rodrigo. September 11 1965, Teatro Colón, Buenos Aires, Argentina (EKR CD P2 Eklipse).
 Ludwig Hoelscher / Bernard Michelin: TBS Vintage Classics. Henry Eccles, Manuel de Falla and Camille Saint-Saëns, May 29, 1960, Osaka ABC Hall, Japan.
 Poesías de Juana de Ibarbourou. Beethoven, Fauré, Grieg, Prokofiev, Ravel, Schubert and Szymanowski. Voices: Inda Ledesma & . Music: Anahi Carfi & Alfredo Rossi. June 19, 1972. Disco GPE 1004. Editorial Aguilar Argentina. Buenos Aires.
 Victoria de los Ángeles canta a Nin.'' Concert collection of Victoria de los Ángeles with various pianists. Alfredo Rossi performed with her "Canço de Nadal", recorded in Montevideo, Uruguay, 1954. World premiere recordings.

References 

1906 births
1986 deaths
Italian male pianists
20th-century pianists
20th-century Italian male musicians
Italian emigrants to Argentina